Luka is a masculine given name used in the South Slavic-speaking countries of Bosnia and Herzegovina, Croatia, Montenegro, Serbia, Slovenia, North Macedonia. It is derived from the Latin name Lucas. The name is common among Christians as a result of Luke the Evangelist.

In Croatia, the name Luka was among the most common masculine given names in the decades between 1990 and 2011, and was the most common name in the 2000s.

Notable people bearing the name include:

 Luka Bebić (born 1937), Croatian politician, former Speaker of the Croatian Parliament
 Luka Bilobrk (born 1985), Bosnian-Herzegovinian football player
 Luka Bogdanović (born 1985), Serbian basketball player
 Luka Brajkovic (born 1999), Austrian basketball player
 Luka Dončić (born 1999), Slovenian basketball player
 Luka Drašković (born 1995), Montenegrin chess player
 Luka Đorđević (born 1994), Montenegrin football player
 Luka Garza (born 1998), American basketball player of Bosnian descent
 Luka Jones (born 1975), American actor and comedian, born Luka Yovetich
 Luka Jović (born 1997), Serbian football player
 Luka Kaliterna (1893-1984), Croatian football player and manager
 Luka Magnotta (born 1982), Canadian porn actor and murderer, born Eric Clinton Kirk Newman
 Luka Menalo (born 1996), Bosnian-Herzegovinian football player
 Luka Merdović (born 1989), Montenegrin football player
 Luka Milivojević (born 1991), Serbian football player
 Luka Mirković (born 1990), Montenegrin football player
 Luka Mitrović (born 1993), Serbian basketball player
 Luka Modrić (born 1985), Croatian football player
 Luka Nakov (born 2000), Bulgarian-Macedonian football player
 Luka Pavićević (born 1968), Montenegrin football player and coach
 Luka "Perkz" Perković (born 1998), Croatian esports player
 Luka Peruzović (born 1952), Croatian football player and manager
 Luka Rakić (born 1991), Montenegrin sprinter
 Luka Stankovski (born 2002), Macedonian football player
 Luka Stepančić (born 1990), Croatian handball player
 Luka Svetec (1826–1921), Slovenian politician, lawyer, author, and philologist
 Luka Šamanić (born 2000), Croatian basketball player
 Luka Šulić (born 1987), Croatian-Slovenian cellist
 Luka Žorić (born 1984), Croatian basketball player

In addition, a Japanese name  is transliterated Luka or Ruka, and can be masculine or feminine (possibly related to Haruka). People with the name include:

 Luka Yoshida-Martin (born 2001), Australian rules footballer

Fictional characters
 Luka Couffaine, a character in the animated television series Miraculous: Tales of Ladybug & Cat Noir
 Luka Kovač, a character in the television series ER
 The subject of the 1987 Suzanne Vega song "Luka"
 Luka Lemmens, a minor character in the Belgian series wtFOCK
 Luka Macken or Ruka Makken, a character in the anime Black Butler
 Luka Millfy or Ruka Mirufi, a character in Kaizoku Sentai Gokaiger
 Megurine Luka/Luka Megurine, a Vocaloid developed by Crypton Future Media
 Luka Redgrave, a character in the Bayonetta series
 Luka Smithee, a character in The Wonderful 101
 Urushibara Luka or Urushibara Ruka, a character in the visual novel Steins;Gate

See also
 Lukić
 Lučić
 Luca (feminine given name)
 Lucija

References

Serbian masculine given names
Slovene masculine given names
Croatian masculine given names
Montenegrin masculine given names
Bosnian masculine given names